Asefabad (also Romanized as Āşefābād and Āşafābād) is a village in Tajan Rural District, in the Central District of Sarakhs County, Razavi Khorasan Province, Iran. At the 2006 census, its population was 463, in 99 families.

See also 

 List of cities, towns and villages in Razavi Khorasan Province

References 

Populated places in Sarakhs County